Martin Vernon (born 4 July 1951) is a former English cricketer. He played for Middlesex between 1974 and 1976 and for Gloucestershire in 1977.

Vernon played irregularly for Middlesex Second XI from 1970, and made his first-team debut in 1974 as an opening bowler. In July 1974, in his third County Championship match, he took 6 for 58 and 5 for 54 against Somerset, twice dismissing Viv Richards leg-before, and dismissing Brian Close for a pair, the first in Close's long career. Vernon took four wickets in seven balls in the second innings. With his pace he was regarded as a possible long-term replacement for John Price in the Middlesex team, but he was unable to maintain his form, and his appearances in first-class cricket were irregular. His best List A cricket figures came in his first match, when he took 3 for 13 off eight overs against Yorkshire in June 1974. He toured Bangladesh with MCC in 1976-77.

References

External links

1951 births
Living people
English cricketers
Gloucestershire cricketers
Middlesex cricketers
People from Marylebone
Cricketers from Greater London
T. N. Pearce's XI cricketers